The 1975–76 Sheffield Shield season was the 74th season of the Sheffield Shield, the domestic first-class cricket competition of Australia. After finishing last the previous two seasons, South Australia, galvanized by their charismatic captain Ian Chappell, took the competition by storm to win the championship.

Table

Statistics

Most Runs
Ian Chappell 840

Most Wickets
Ashley Mallett 38

References

Sheffield Shield
Sheffield Shield
Sheffield Shield seasons